Léo is a proper noun in French, meaning lion". Its etymological root lies in the Latin word Leo.

Léo is used as a diminutive or variant of the names Léon, Léonard, Léonardon, Leonardo, Léonid, Léonor, Léonore, Eléonore, Léopold and Léonie, and in recent times has been adopted as a fully-fledged given name on its own.

The feminine variant is Léa.

The following people have the name Léo:

In music
 Léo Arnaud (1904–1991), French-American film score composer
 Léo Chauliac (1913–1977), French jazz pianist, composer and conductor
 Léo Daniderff (1878–1943), French composer
 Léo Delibes (1836–1891), French composer
 Léo Ferré (1916–1993), French poet and singer-songwriter
 Léo Marjane (1912–2016), French singer
 Léo Missir (1925–2009), French composer
 Léo Rispal (born 2000), French singer
 Léo Souris (1911–1990), Belgian composer, arranger, planner and conductor
 Léo Stronda (born 1992), Brazilian singer

In sport 
Football
 Léo (born 1975), Brazilian footballer
 Léo (born 1980), Brazilian footballer
 Léo (born 1988), Brazilian footballer
 Léo (born 1990), Brazilian footballer
 Léo (born 1992), Brazilian footballer
 Léo Andrade (born 1998), Brazilian footballer
 Léo Artur (born 1995), Brazilian footballer
 Léo Bahia (born 1986), Brazilian footballer
 Léo Baptistão (born 1992), Brazilian footballer
 Léo Bonatini (born 1994), Brazilian footballer
 Léo Borges (born 2001), Brazilian footballer
 Léo Carioca (born 1985), Brazilian footballer
 Léo Castro (born 1994), Brazilian footballer
 Léo Ceará (born 1995), Brazilian footballer
 Léo Chú (born 2000), Brazilian footballer
 Léo Cittadini (born 1994), Brazilian footballer
 Léo Condé (born 1978), Brazilian football manager
 Léo Cordeiro (born 1985), Brazilian footballer
 Léo Costa (born 1986), Brazilian footballer
 Léo Duarte (born 1996), Brazilian footballer
 Léo Dubois (born 1994), French footballer
 Léo Eichmann (born 1936), Swiss footballer
 Léo Fioravanti (born 1992), Brazilian footballer
 Léo Fortunato (born 1983), Brazilian footballer
 Léo Gago (born 1983), Brazilian footballer
 Léo Gamalho (born 1986), Brazilian footballer
 Léo Gomes (born 1997), Brazilian footballer
 Léo Gonçalves (born 1989), Brazilian footballer 
 Léo Inácio (born 1976), Brazilian footballer
 Léo Itaperuna (born 1989), Brazilian footballer
 Léo Jabá (born 1998), Brazilian footballer
 Léo Jardim (born 1995), Brazilian footballer
 Léo Júnior (born 1954), Brazilian footballer
 Léo Kanu (born 1988), Brazilian footballer
 Léo Lacroix (born 1992), Swiss footballer
 Léo Lelis (born 1993), Brazilian footballer
 Léo Leroy (born 2000), French footballer
 Léo Lima (born 1982), Brazilian footballer
 Léo Maceió (born 1987), Brazilian footballer
 Léo Matos (born 1986), Brazilian footballer
 Léo Medeiros (born 1981), Brazilian footballer
 Léo Mineiro (born 1990), Brazilian footballer
 Léo Morais (born 1991), Brazilian footballer
 Léo Moura (born 1978), Brazilian footballer
 Léo Natel (born 1997), Brazilian footballer
 Léo Ortiz (born 1996), Brazilian footballer
 Léo Passos (born 1999), Brazilian footballer
 Léo Paulista (born 1983), Brazilian footballer
 Léo Pelé (born 1996), Brazilian footballer
 Léo Pereira (born 1996), Brazilian footballer
 Léo Pereira (born 2000), Brazilian footballer
 Léo Pétrot (born 1997), French footballer
 Léo Pimenta (born 1982), Brazilian footballer
 Léo Jaime da Silva Pinheiro (born 1986), Brazilian footballer
 Léo Príncipe (born 1996), Brazilian footballer
 Léo Rodrigues (born 1991), Brazilian footballer
 Léo Rodrigues (born 1999), Portuguese footballer
 Léo Rigo (born 1995), Brazilian footballer
 Léo Rocha (born 1985), Brazilian footballer
 Léo San (born 1982), Brazilian footballer
 Léo Santos (born 1998), Brazilian footballer
 Léo Schwechlen (born 1989), French footballer
 Léo Sena (born 1995), Brazilian footballer
 Léo Silva (born 1985), Brazilian footballer
 Léo Simas (born 1998), Brazilian footballer
 Léo Tilica (born 1995), Brazilian footballer
 Léo Veloso (born 1987), Brazilian footballer

Other sports
 Léo Bergère (born 1996), French triathlete
 Léo Chuard (born 1998), Swiss ice hockey player
 Léo Dandurand (1889–1964), American-Canadian ice hockey coach and owner
 Léo Le Blé Jaques (born 1997), French snowboarder
 Léo Lacroix (born 1937), French alpine skier
 Léo Martins (born 1989), Brazilian-born Portuguese beach soccer player
 Léo Rooman (1928–2019), Belgian field hockey player
 Léo Rossi (born 1999), French badminton player
 Léo Seydoux (born 1998), Swiss footballer
 Léo Vieira (born 1976), Brazilian submission grappler and Brazilian jiu-jitsu instructor
 Léo Vincent (born 1995), French cyclist
 Léo Westermann (born 1992), French basketball player

Other occupations
 Léo, pseudonym of Brazilian comics writer Luiz Eduardo de Oliveira (born 1944)
 Léo Apotheker (born 1953), German business executive
 Léo Battesti, Corsican politician
 Léo Bergoffen (1922–2020), Jewish emigrant from Nazi Germany to France
 Léo Bérubé (1884–1967), Canadian lawyer and politician
 Léo Brière (born 1994), French mentalist and illusionist
 Léo Bureau-Blouin (born 1991), Canadian politician
 Léo Cadieux (1908–2005), Canadian politician, Minister of National Defense from 1967 to 1970
 Léo Campion (1905–1992), French actor and anarchist
 Léo Collard (1902–1981), Belgian politician
 Léo Errera (1858–1905), Belgian botanist
 Léo Gausson (1860–1944), French painter and printmaker
 Léo Gauthier (1904–1964), Canadian Member of Parliament
 Léo Hamon (1908–1993), French politician
 Léo Joannon (1904–1969), French film director and writer
 Léo Lagrange (1900–1940), French Under-Secretary of State for Sports and Recreation under the Popular Front
 Léo Laporte-Blairsy (1865–1923), French sculptor
 Léo Lasko (1885–1949), German screenwriter and film director
 Léo Legrand, French actor
 Léo Lévesque, Canadian poet, essayist and writer
 Léo Major (1921–2008), Canadian Army soldier
 Léo Malet (1909–1996), French crime novelist and surrealist writer
 Léo Marion (1899–1979), Canadian scientist
 Léo Pétillon (1903–1996), Belgian civil servant and lawyer in the Belgian Congo
 Léo Piquette (born 1946), Canadian politician
 Léo Pons (born 1996), French filmmaker
 Léo Quievreux (born 1971), French comic book writer and illustrator
 Léo Richer Laflèche (1888–1956), Canadian general, civil servant, diplomat and politician
 Léo Rocco (1894–1976), Swiss architect
 Léo Schnug (1878–1933), Alsatian painter and illustrator
 Léo Staats (1877–1952), French ballet dancer, choreographer and director
 Léo Taxil (1854–1907), French writer and journalist
 Léo Testut (1849–1925), French physician and anatomist
 Léo d'Ursel (1867–1934), Belgian diplomat
 Léo Valentin (1919–1956), French adventurer

See also 
 
 Léa (disambiguation)
 Léo (disambiguation)
 Leo (given name)
 Leo (surname) 

French masculine given names